The Miracle at Speedy Motors, published in 2008, is the ninth in The No. 1 Ladies' Detective Agency series of novels by Alexander McCall Smith, set in Gaborone, Botswana, and featuring the Motswana protagonist Precious Ramotswe.

Plot summary
It has never occurred to Precious Ramotswe that there might be disadvantages to being the best-known lady detective in Botswana. But when she receives a threatening anonymous letter, she is compelled to reconsider her previously unconquerable belief in a kind world and good neighbours.

While she ponders the identity of the letter-writer, Mma Ramotswe has a further set of problems to solve, both professional and personal. There is an adopted child's poignant search for her true family, and Mr J.L.B. Matekoni's pursuit of an expensive miracle for their own foster daughter Motholeli.

References

2008 British novels
The No. 1 Ladies' Detective Agency
Novels by Alexander McCall Smith
Little, Brown and Company books